TORU or Toru may refer to:

TORU, spacecraft system
Toru (given name), Japanese male given name
Toru, Pakistan, village in Mardan District of Khyber-Pakhtunkhwa, Pakistan
Tõru, village in Kaarma Parish, Saare County, Estonia